RlungTa is the first studio album by Mumbai-based Fusion band Samved. The album was released on 12 April 2014 signed under Universal Music Group. RlungTa is a blend of Hindustani Classical and electronica textured with the soulful sound of the Sarangi.
The album is produced by electronic artists/music producers Ritvik Joe and KK, the founding members of the band. The Album was well received in the Indian Subcontinent and in Europe. The debut album got nominated and won the band Best Folk/Fusion Artist of the Year for 2014 at Radio City Freedom Awards along with The Best Produced Album in the band category at the prestigious IIRA awards in 2015.

Personnel

Ritvik Joe – Keys, electronic (effects/samples), guitars
KK – Electronic and bass
Zeeshan Khan – Vocalist
Christie Bourcq – Featured vocals
Sangeet Mishra – Sarangi
Kirti Das – Percussions

Production
Ritvik Joe – Producer
KK – Producer
Ayan De – Mixed and mastered 

Art work
Peg Green – Album artwork
Shekhar Karalkar – Inlay photographs

Lyrics
"Love Science" – Ustad Maqbool Hussain Khan
"Wind Horse Flight" – Mahajabeen Khan
"Infinite Days" – Christie Bourcq (French) and Ritvik Joe(English)
"Gyratin’ Solang" – Christie Bourcq (French)

Track listing
All tracks are written and performed by Samved.
 "Kama Unit
 "Love Science
 "Anamudi Access
 "Eastern Clouds
 "Maal Kausa
 "Wind Horse Flight
 "7 Brick Walls
 "Infinite Days" featuring Christie Bourcq
 "Gyratin’ Solang" featuring Christie Bourcq

Awards and recognitions

References

2014 albums
Samved albums